Albirhodobacter marinus is a Gram-negative and rod-shaped bacterium from the genus of Albirhodobacter which has been isolated from water from the sea shore in Visakhapatnam in India.

References 

Rhodobacteraceae
Bacteria described in 2015